Buglen (Buğulen) is a rural locality (a selo) in Buynaksky District, Republic of Dagestan, Russia. The population was 1,998 as of 2010. There are 18 streets.

Geography 
Buglen is located 10 km southeast of Buynaksk (the district's administrative centre) by road, on the left bank of the Buglen-ozen River. Nizhneye Kazanishche is the nearest rural locality.

References 

Rural localities in Buynaksky District